Buchenavia is a genus of plant in family Combretaceae. It contains the following species (but this list may be incomplete):
 Buchenavia grandis, Ducke
 Buchenavia hoehneana, N. Mattos
 Buchenavia iguaratensis, N. Mattos
 Buchenavia kleinii, Exell
 Buchenavia pabstii, Marq. & Val.
 Buchenavia rabelloana, Mattos
 Buchenavia tetraphylla, (Aubl.) R. A. Howard
 Buchenavia tomentosa, Eichler 
 Buchenavia viridiflora, Ducke 

 
Taxonomy articles created by Polbot